Mon Oncle (My Uncle) is a 1958 comedy film by French filmmaker Jacques Tati. The first of Tati's films to be released in colour, Mon Oncle won the Academy Award for Best Foreign Language Film, a Special Prize at the 1958 Cannes Film Festival, and the New York Film Critics Circle Award for Best Foreign Language Film, receiving more honors than any of Tati's other cinematic works.

The film centers on the socially awkward yet lovable character of Monsieur Hulot and his quixotic struggle with postwar France's infatuation with modern architecture, mechanical efficiency and consumerism.  As with most Tati films, Mon Oncle is largely a visual comedy; color and lighting are employed to help tell the story.  The dialogue in Mon Oncle is barely audible, and largely subordinated to the role of a sound effect. The drifting noises of heated arguments and idle banter complement other sounds and the physical movements of the characters, intensifying comedic effect.  The complex soundtrack also uses music to characterize environments, including a lively musical theme that represents Hulot's world of comical inefficiency and freedom.

At its debut in 1958 in France, Mon Oncle was denounced by some critics for what they viewed as a reactionary or even poujadiste view of an emerging French consumer society, which had lately embraced a new wave of industrial modernization and a more rigid social structure.  However, this criticism soon gave way in the face of the film's huge popularity in France and abroad – even in the U.S., where rampant discretionary consumption and a recession had caused those on both the right and the left to question the economic and social values of the era. The film was another big success for Tati, with a total of 4,576,928 admissions in France.

Plot
M. Hulot (Jacques Tati) is the dreamy, impractical, and adored uncle of nine-year-old Gérard Arpel, who lives with his materialistic parents, M. and Mme. Arpel, in an ultra-modern geometric house and garden, Villa Arpel, in a new suburb of Paris, situated just beyond the crumbling stone buildings of the old neighborhoods of the city. Gérard's parents are entrenched in a machine-like existence of work, fixed gender roles, the acquisition of status through possessions, and conspicuous displays to impress guests, such as the fish-shaped fountain at the center of the garden that, in a running gag, Mme. Arpel activates only for important visitors.

Each element of Villa Arpel is stylistically rather than functionally designed, creating an environment completely indifferent to the comfort, or lack of comfort, of its occupants. In choosing modern architecture to punctuate his satire, Tati once stated, "" ("geometrical lines do not produce likeable people"). From inconveniently-located stepping stones, to difficult-to-sit-on furniture, to a kitchen filled with deafeningly loud appliances, every facet of Villa Arpel emphasizes the impracticality of a dedication to superficial aesthetics and electrical gadgets over the necessities of daily living.

Despite the superficial beauty of its modern design, the Arpels' home is entirely impersonal, as are the Arpels themselves. In fact, M. and Mme. Arpel have completely subordinated their individuality to maintain their social position and their shiny new possessions. Tati emphasizes his themes surrounding the Arpel lifestyle (as well as M. Arpel's automatonic workplace, Plastac) with monochromatic shades and cloudy days.

By contrast, Monsieur Hulot lives in an old and run-down city district. He is unemployed, and gets around town either on foot or on a VéloSoleX motorized bicycle. Gérard, utterly bored by the sterility and monotony of his life with his parents, fastens himself to his uncle at every opportunity. Hulot, little more than a child himself at times, is completely at home with Gérard, but also completely ineffectual at controlling his horseplay with his school friends, who take delight in tormenting adults with practical jokes.  Exasperated at their relative's perceived immaturity, the Arpels soon scheme to saddle him with the twin yokes of family and business responsibilities.

Cast 
 Jacques Tati as Monsieur Hulot
 Jean-Pierre Zola as Monsieur Arpel
 Adrienne Servantie as Madame Arpel
 Alain Bécourt as Gérard Arpel
 Lucien Frégis as Monsieur Pichard
 Betty Schneider as Betty (landlord's daughter)
 Jean-François Martial as Walter
 Dominique Marie as Neighbor
 Yvonne Arnaud as Georgette (the maid)
 Adelaide Danieli as Madame Pichard
 Régis Fontenay as Braces dealer
 Claude Badolle as Flea market dealer
 Max Martel as Drunken man
 Nicolas Bataille as Working man

Production

The sets for the film, designed by Jacques Lagrange, were built in 1956 at Victorine Studios (now known as Studios Riviera), near Nice, and torn down after filming was complete.

English-language version
An English version of the film, nine minutes shorter than the original and released as My Uncle, was filmed at the same time as the French-language version. There are slight differences in the staging of the scenes and in the performances. In the English-language release, French signs are replaced by ones in English; important dialogue is dubbed in English, although background voices remain in French.

Reception
Bosley Crowther said the film had a "cast of colorful and adroit supporting players, all nonprofessionals" and a "gay but somewhat monotonous musical score";  he called the film "perceptibly contrived when it lingers too long and gets too deeply into the dullness of things mechanical. After you've pushed one button and one modernistic face, you've pushed them all. Mr. Hulot [as played by Tati] is the focus of amusement, not electrical doors and machines that squeeze out plastic hose."  Crowther noted that its style of humor "was done superbly more than twenty-five years ago by René Clair in À Nous la Liberté and afterward by Charlie Chaplin in Modern Times."  Variety said that although it was "somewhat long for a comedy, Jacques Tati's film has inventiveness, gags, warmth and a 'poetic' approach to satire"; they complimented the film's "expert blocking out of the characters, creative use of sound, and eschewing of all useless dialog."

See also
 List of submissions to the 31st Academy Awards for Best Foreign Language Film
 List of French submissions for the Academy Award for Best Foreign Language Film

References

External links
 
 Mon Oncle an essay by Matt Zoller Seitz at The Criterion Collection
 Mon Oncle at Tativille
 Mon Oncle film trailer at Turner Classic Movies Classic Film Union

1958 films
1958 comedy films
Italian comedy films
Best Foreign Language Film Academy Award winners
Films directed by Jacques Tati
Films scored by Alain Romans
Films set in Paris
French comedy films
1950s French-language films
Gaumont Film Company films
French satirical films
1950s Italian films
1950s French films